is a railway station on the Tadami Line in the town of  Kaneyama, Ōnuma District, Fukushima Prefecture, Japan, operated by East Japan Railway Company (JR East).

Lines

Station layout
Aizu-Yokota Station has one side platform serving a single bi-directional track. The platform is very short and can only accommodate a single carriage. The station is unattended.

History
The station was absorbed into the JR East network upon the privatization of the JNR on April 1, 1987.

The closed section resumed operations on 1 October 2022.

Surrounding area
Tadami River
 Yokota Post Office

See also
 List of railway stations in Japan

References

External links
 JR East Station information 

Railway stations in Fukushima Prefecture
Tadami Line
Railway stations in Japan opened in 1963
Stations of East Japan Railway Company
Kaneyama, Fukushima